It's a Hard Life may refer to:

”It's a Hard Life”,  a song by the British rock band Queen, written by lead singer Freddie Mercury and featured on their 1984 album The Works
It's a Hard Life, Italian novel by Luciano Bianciardi 
"It's a Hard Life", song by Roger Daltrey from his 1973 album Daltrey
"It's a Hard Life Wherever You Go", a song by Nanci Griffith from  her 1989 album Storms